Julie Johnston is a Canadian writer. She was raised in Smiths Falls, Ontario, in the Ottawa Valley. She studied at the University of Toronto. She now lives in Peterborough, Ontario.

Her first two novels for young adults won the Governor General's Award for English-language children's literature.

Works 
Hero of Lesser Causes (1992)
Adam and Eve and Pinch-Me (1994)
The Only Outcast (1998)
Love Ya Like a Sister: A Story of Friendship from the Journals of Katie Ouriou (1999)
In Spite of Killer Bees (2001)
Susannah's Quill (2004)
As if by Accident (2005)
Little Red Lies (2013)
Two Moons in August

Awards 
Governor General's Award for English-language children's literature (1992, 1994)
National Chapter of Canada IODE Violet Downey Book Award (1993)
Ruth Schwartz Children's Book Award (Young Adult/Middle Reader Category) (1995)
Young Adult Canadian Book Award Young-adult-fiction awards (1995)

References

External links 

 The Governor General's Literary Awards
 Stellar Award
 

Year of birth missing (living people)
Living people
Canadian women novelists
Canadian writers of young adult literature
20th-century Canadian novelists
21st-century Canadian novelists
Writers from Ontario
People from Smiths Falls
20th-century Canadian women writers
Women writers of young adult literature
21st-century Canadian women writers